British Skydiving is the national governing body for skydiving in the United Kingdom.

Overview

British Skydiving was founded in 1960 to organise, govern and further the advancement of sport parachuting within the UK.

British Skydiving aims to encourage participation in skydiving within the UK. In 2016 there were nearly 6,000 full members and around 60,000 students, and around 30 affiliated training organisations.

The association is funded by membership subscriptions and has an annually elected council which controls all aspects of skydiving on behalf of the Civil Aviation Authority. Unlike many other sports which suffer from fragmented and divided governing bodies, the British Parachute Association represents most UK skydivers, and most skydivers within the UK are members of the Association.

British Skydiving is constituted as a company limited by guarantee. The association's headquarters are at Glen Parva, Leicestershire.

Following the 50th anniversary of British Skydiving, an archive project was established to record and collect the history of the sport in the UK and of the Association.

Association name changed to British Skydiving 27/11/2019 to bring awareness of the sport to a greater audience

Council

British Skydiving council consists of ten elected members, together with two independent directors from outside the sport.  The council is chaired by Craig Poxon.

Drop zones

In 2015 there were 29 affiliated drop zones within British Skydiving. These include:
Black Knights Parachute Centre – Cockerham, Lancashire
British Parachute Schools – RAF Langar, Nottinghamshire
Cornish Parachute Centre – Peranporth, Cornwall
GoSkydive – Old Sarum Airfield, Salisbury
Hinton Skydiving Centre – Hinton-in-the-Hedges, Northamptonshire
Joint Services Parachute Centre (Army Parachute Association) – Netheravon, Wiltshire
London Parachute School – Lewknor, Oxfordshire
North London Skydiving Centre – Chatteris, Cambridgeshire
North West Parachute Centre – Cark, Cumbria
Paragon Skydiving Club – Errol, Perth and Kinross
Skydive Headcorn – Headcorn Aerodrome, Headcorn, Ashford, Kent
Services Parachute Centre, Ballykelly, County Londonderry
Silver Stars Parachute Team (The Royal Logistic Corps) – South Cerney, Gloucestershire
Skyhigh Skydiving(formerly: Peterlee Parachute Centre) – Peterlee, Co. Durham
UK Parachuting at Sibson Airfield (Peterborough Parachute Centre) – Wansford, Cambridgeshire
Skydive GB Parachute Club, Bridlington – Grindale, East Riding of Yorkshire
Skydive Jersey – St. Peter, Jersey
Skydive St Andrews – Glenrothes, Fife
Skydive St George – Darlington, Durham
Skydive Strathallan – Strathallan, Perth and Kinross
Skydive Swansea – Fairwood, Swansea
Skydive UK – Dunkeswell, Devon
Skydive Weston (Royal Air Force Sport Parachute Association) – Weston-on-the-Green, Oxfordshire
Skydive Hibaldstow – Hibaldstow, North Lincolnshire
The Parachute Centre – Tilstock, Shropshire
UK Parachuting – Beccles, Suffolk
Wild Geese Parachute Centre – Movenis & Killykergan, County Londonderry

References

External links
 

Parachuting in the United Kingdom
Parachuting organizations
Parachute
Organisations based in Leicestershire
Sports organizations established in 1961
1961 establishments in the United Kingdom